Gillellus jacksoni is a species of sand stargazer native to the Antilles where it can be found at depths of from .  It can reach a maximum length of  SL. The specific name honours Felix N. Jackson who was a Museum Technician at the Gulf Coast Research Laboratory in Ocean Springs, Mississippi.

References

jacksoni
Fish described in 1982
Taxa named by Charles Eric Dawson